Lăcusteni is a commune located in Vâlcea County, Oltenia, Romania. It is composed of five villages: Contea, Gănești, Lăcusteni, Lăcustenii de Jos and Lăcustenii de Sus. Until 2004, these were part of Zătreni Commune, but were split off to form a separate commune.

References

Communes in Vâlcea County
Localities in Oltenia